Boing is a Spanish free-to-air television channel launched in 2010 and owned as a joint venture between Mediaset España and Warner Bros. Discovery through its International unit. When Cartoonito and Cartoon Network were shut down on 30 June 2013, many of their programmes were moved to Boing, alongside new Boomerang programmes. Series on the channel are also available in English via a secondary audio feed.

Additional Boing feeds are available in Italy and Sub-Saharan Africa, with Cartoon Network and Cartoonito Boomerang (excluding Africa) also being available in those territories.

History

On 28 November 2008, Telecinco and Turner, reached an agreement to introduce a children's programming block on the Telecinco channel, with some 42 hours of weekly programming. Three days later, the Boing drawing container began in Telecinco and Telecinco 2.

Months later, on 11 May 2009, Boing went from Telecinco 2 to Factoría de Ficción, of the same group, with the same contents and similar schedules, since Telecinco 2 became La Siete and changed part of its programming.

On 2 August 2010, Telecinco announced the launch of Boing as its fourth free-to-air television channel, moving from a series container to an open-themed channel. It would be dedicated 24 hours a day to the youngest in the house, with Turner star products. In its first weeks of broadcasting, Boing offered a six-hour programming loop that hosted the animated series Geronimo Stilton, Beyblade: Metal Fusion, Dinosaur King, Powerpuff Girls Z, Ben 10: Alien Force, Bakugan Battle Brawlers and Inazuma Eleven. In the followings weeks, it incorporated progressively fictional content aimed at children and adolescent viewers.

On 9 August 2010, it began its test broadcasts showing a letter of adjustment and on 23 August a promotional loop of series that would be broadcast in its premiere on 1 September of the same year.
On 1 September 2010, its official broadcasts began with a programme that included a welcome selection of the Turner factory's star products. Telecinco's new children's channel premiered with a 0.58% quota. With the arrival of the new channel, Boing, the series container of Telecinco and Factoría de Ficción was renamed SuperBoing. On 1 January 2011, it ceased broadcasting on both channels, after the merger with Cuatro. Its contents were shown exclusively on the Boing channel.

On 28 November 2010, the channel premiered La gran película de Ed, Edd y Eddy, an animated film from the series Ed, Edd and Eddy. Although its official release was one year and 22 days earlier (6 November 2009) on the private and pay-TV network Cartoon Network, it was the first film broadcast on Boing and the first feature of a previous series broadcast on the network.

On 31 May 2011, the cable operator ONO incorporated the Boing channel in its basic package (which already had 17 children's channels) on dial 64, so all subscribers to the operator have access to that channel.

On 20 June 2011, Boing's creative and advertising group, Time Warner and Publiespaña, changed the channel's corporate image with new advertising blocks, adding animated curtains in the presentation of the series and more information. The logo was also modified to a darker tone and with a spherical shape.

On 28 June 2011, Mediaset Spain announced that, from the fourth quarter of the year, Publiespaña would launch a commercial policy in the channel with Desayuna y merienda con Boing containers. Both are presented by the EVA robot.

On 16 August 2011, pay-TV operator Movistar TV added the Boing channel on its 63 dial. It later changed to 69 dial. In 2015 it became Movistar+, so it is now on 97 dial.

On 7 September 2011, Boing's official website renewed the content of the website, transforming it to its new corporate image and creating new sections. These sections include a games section, a series section, a video and photo portal and a blog where users are informed daily of the new releases that come to the channel.

On 16 September 2011, Grupo Zeta launched the first issue of Boing Magazine to the kiosks. After an agreement between Grupo Zeta and the communication groups Turner Broadcasting System and Mediaset España, the publication was born with the same drive as the young children's channel.

On Saturday, 4 February 2012, Mediaset Spain's children's channel reached its daily audience record with a 1.8% screen share, and was even one tenth (1.9%) away from Neox, Atresmedia's thematic channel. One month after making history, on 3 March of the same year, it obtained a 2% screen share, two tenths away from its main competitor Disney Channel (2.2%). Finally, weeks after reaching the daily maximum with a quota of 2.0%, on Saturday 14 April it repeated its success by giving the channel an audience share of 2.5% of the screen in total day and reaching the historic maximum since its premiere. Almost two months later, on 2 June, the children's channel of Mediaset Spain broke a new record on Saturday, giving the group a quota of 2.6% daily screen share.

In July 2012, Boing achieved the monthly maximum in DTT with a share of 2.1%, surpassing its great competitor Disney Channel by 3 tenths. The channel gets the best result of its history thanks to films such as Ice Age. In terms of audience, it is the second most watched channel among children from 4 to 12 years with a commercial target of 14.1%.

Since November 2015, one month after being awarded a new HD channel by the government, Mediaset broadcast Boing in HD on a temporary basis until 7 January 2016 Being replaced by Energy HD, and this was replaced on 21 April]by Be Mad TV, the new channel of Mediaset Spain.

On 29 March 2016, the channel renewed its corporate image, adapting to the worldwide image of the channel that premiered its Italian version on 7 March of the same year.

Current programming
 Adventure Time (replays)
 The Amazing World of Gumball (replays)
 Be Cool, Scooby-Doo!
 Doraemon (2005)
 Grizzy and the Lemmings 
 Looney Tunes Cartoons
 Pokémon
 Rabbids Invasion
 Scooby-Doo and Guess Who?
 Scooby-Doo! Mystery Incorporated
 Teen Titans Go!
 The Ollie & Moon Show
 The Rubbish World of Dave Spud
 Tom and Jerry in New York 
 We Baby Bears

Former programming

 A Penguin's Troubles
 A Pup Named Scooby-Doo
 The Adventures of Chuck and Friends
 The Adventures of Tintin
 The Amazing Spiez!
 Angel's Friends
 Apple & Onion (Manzana y Cebolleta)
 Angels of Jarm
 Animaniacs
 The Avengers: Earth's Mightiest Heroes
 The Backyardigans
 Bakugan Battle Brawlers
 Bakugan: New Vestroia
 Bakugan: Gundalian Invaders
 Barbie: Life in the Dreamhouse
 Barney & Friends
 The Basil Brush Show
 Ben 10 (2005)
 Ben 10: Alien Force
 Ben 10: Ultimate Alien
 Ben 10: Ultimate Challenge
 Ben 10: Omniverse
 Beyblade: Metal Fury
 Beyblade: Metal Fusion
 Beyblade: Metal Masters
 Bindi the Jungle Girl
 Blue's Clues
 Bob the Builder
 Bratz
 Bunnytown
 Chowder
 Clarence
 Craig of the Creek (El Mundo de Craig)
 Camp Lazlo
 Code Lyoko
 Codename: Kids Next Door
 Courage the Cowardly Dog
 Cow and Chicken
 Dexter's Laboratory
 Doraemon (1979) (Doraemon, el gato cósmico)
 Dragon Ball Super
 Digimon
 Dinosaur King
 Doctor Who
 Dragon Ball Z
 DreamWorks Dragons Riders of Berk
 Duck Dodgers
 Ed, Edd n Eddy
 Ever After High
 Family Game Night
 Fireman Sam
 Foster's Home for Imaginary Friends
 Garfield and Friends
 Game  Shakers
 The Garfield Show
 Generator Rex
 Geronimo Stilton
 Gormiti Nature Unleashed
 The Grim Adventures of Billy & Mandy
 Handy Manny
 Hi Hi Puffy AmiYumi
 Higglytown Heroes
 The Heroic Quest of the Valiant Prince Ivandoe
 Inspector Gadget
 Inazuma Eleven
 Idol x Warrior Miracle Tunes!
 Jewelpet
 Jewelpet Twinkle
 Johnny Bravo
 Johnny Test
 Just Kidding
 Kipper
 La Voz Kidz
 Lego Star Wars: The Padawan Menace
 Lego Star Wars: The Yoda Chronicles
 Lego Ninjago: Masters of Spinjitzu
 Level Up
 The Life and Times of Juniper Lee
 Life with Derek
 Life with Boys
 Looney Tunes
 Malcolm in the Middle
 Masha and the Bear
 Martin Mystery
 The Marvelous Misadventures of Flapjack
 Max & Ruby
 Mickey Mouse Clubhouse
 Mike, Lu & Og
 Mixels
 Monster High
 Mona & Sketch (replays)
 Mucha Lucha
 My Gym Partner's a Monkey
 My Little Pony: Friendship Is Magic 
 Mighty Mike (Mucho Mike)
 Naruto
 Naruto Shippuden
 Nexo Knights
 Nicky, Ricky, Dicky & Dawn (Nicky, Ricky, Dicky y Dawn)
 Oggy and the Cockroaches
 One Piece
 Out of Jimmy's Head
 Over the Garden Wall
 Peppa Pig
 The Pink Panther (1993 TV series)
 Polly Pocket
 Poppets Town
 Pound Puppies
 Power Rangers Samurai
 Power Rangers Megaforce
 The Powerpuff Girls (1998)
 Powerpuff Girls Z
 Primeval
 Pucca
 Ranma ½
 Regular Show (Historias Corrientes)
 Sally Bollywood
 Sesame Street
 SMart
 Superted
 Taffy
 The Thundermans (Los Thunderman)
 The Thundermans (replays)
 The Secret Saturdays
 The Smurfs
 Toony Tube
 Sonic X
 Squirrel Boy (Andy y Rodney)
 Strawberry Shortcake
 Strawberry Shortcake's Berry Bitty Adventures
 Supernoobs (Supernovatos)
 The Sylvester and Tweety Mysteries
 Taz-Mania
 Teen Titans
 Teletubbies
 The Magic Key
 The Trap Door
 The Three Friends and Jerry
 Thomas and Friends
 ThunderCats (2011 TV series)
 Tiny Toon Adventures
 Titeuf
 Tom & Jerry Kids
 Tom and Jerry
 Tom and Jerry Tales
 Top Cat
 Transformers Animated
 Transformers: Prime
 Transformers: Robots in Disguise (2015 TV series)
 Tweenies
 Uncle Grandpa (Tito Yayo) (replays)
 Unnatural History
 Wacky Races
 Wakfu
 Wallace and Gromit's Cracking Contraptions
 We Bare Bears
 What's New, Scooby-Doo?
 Wif Qwac Qwac
 Wimpole Village
 Wipeout
 Wonder Pets
 Xiaolin Showdown
 Yo Gabba Gabba
 Yo-Kai Watch
 Yogi Bear
 Yu-Gi-Oh!
 Yu-Gi-Oh! GX
 Yu-Gi-Oh! 5D's

See also
 Boing (Italy)
 Boing (Africa)
 Cartoon Network (Spain)

References

External links
  
 Cartoon Network (former channel) 

Boing (TV channel)
2010 establishments in Spain
Television channels and stations established in 2010
Television stations in Spain
Spanish-language television stations
Children's television networks
Channels of Mediaset España Comunicación
Cartoon Network
Cartoonito
Turner Broadcasting System Spain
Warner Bros. Discovery EMEA